FishingKaki.com (aka FishingKaki, FK.com or simply FK) is an internet-based message boards focused on fishing. It currently has 400,000 registered members.

FishingKaki.com is a forum for fishing enthusiasts in Singapore and beyond, getting visitors from many parts of the world, including the United States, United Kingdom, and Australia. Now owned and led by Luke Maow Bear, FishingKaki.com has since been revamped in all aspects, which includes design, structure and direction.

FishingKaki.com has since migrated to Amazon Web Services for both speed and stability.

Forum Structure
The structure of Fishingkaki.com is divided based on a few major categories.

FishingKaki.com Announcements
Announcements of events and new products are posted here.

Catch Reports
This forum is for users to post their Catch Reports (CRs). Catch Reports are articles or a collection of pictures of a catch or fishing trip.

Discussion
This is the main forum which is divided by fishing type. Examples are luring, jigging, surf casting and fly fishing. Also included in this forum is "Coffeeshop Talk", which is for non-fishing related discussions.

Looking For Kakis
Users looking for others to fish with post here. This includes charters who have signed up as partners of FishingKaki.com.

Partners
Partners of FishingKaki.com are listed here. Partners are:
 Rapala VMC
 Lure Haven
 Danlex Tackle

Classifieds
The Classifieds section is where members buy and sell their equipment. Included in this section are the MiniV Shops and MegaV Shops, virtual shops that have signed up with FishingKaki.com to list and sell their items.

Charter Listing
The Charter Listing contains charter partners of FishingKaki.com.

History

Fishing Singapore
Originally started as Spikeman's Fishing Singapore, it was a hobby website created by Spike Choo in 1997 with angling as its main theme. In 1998, KC, an administrator running the Singapore ONE Community Portal, invited Spike to host his site in the S-One Portal. Spike took the opportunity to rename the site to Fishing Singapore. KC also helped to create a Fishing Forum as part of the new website. As Singapore's first ever Fishing Internet forum, it rapidly gained popularity among the younger generation of anglers in Singapore. It was then known as Fishing Singapore Forum. Spike got to know John Hooi via the forum and after a few fishing trips, invited John to help manage the site with him.

John Hooi served as both the administrator of the forum and the webmaster of the Fishing Singapore website together with Spike. John later invited four forum moderators to run the forum. They were Michael Lim, Jimmy Aw, Abang and Loh Tee.

The technical functions of this board were limited, which gave rise to many controversial issues that escalated into countless internet flame-wars. Among the issues were the administrator John Hooi's capability to oversee the forum, the four moderators' ability to moderate and much mud-slinging among the commercial entities in Singapore's fishing industry. It was a very active and chaotic period with constant flaming among many parties.

Fishingkaki.com (Past)

The transformation from Fishing Singapore to Fishingkaki.com took place in 2001 when S-ONE announced that they were shutting down the Fishing Singapore Forum.

John Hooi then started funding the site himself and officially registered the domain name Fishingkaki.com and with the help of his friend Viper of Console City, began FishingKaki with a forum based on the PHP Bulletin Board system. The site was hosted in the U.S. All users of Fishing Singapore Forum migrated over to the new site, and soon after that, the company S-One ceased its services.

With the advanced functions of PHPBB, the forum was structured into different categories. A special fly fishing section was introduced, headed by Jimmy Aw. With this new forum, members were now required to register with a valid email address to access its functions as opposed to how it used to be done before.

Spike and John had ideas to turn Fishingkaki into a web portal but plans for this were soon abandoned. Spike, who designed and conceptualised both the Fishingkaki logo and motto, handed the rights for the design to John as a goodwill gesture when he retired from active participation in the running of the new site. During this period, Fishingkaki grew into a successful internet forum with more than 5000 registered members managed by more than 16 moderators.

Fishingkaki.com was migrated from US to Singapore in 2002. In 2003, Fishingkaki.com was officially registered as a Private Limited Company with John Hooi and Mike Goh as the company's Directors.

After the site crashed in March 2005, a new server was found and Fishingkaki was recreated on 20 April 2005 with the help of Mike Goh and staff of Fragnetics.com before they shifted yet again to NSWGroup who currently hosts Fishingkaki.

Jeffrey Tee joined Fishingkaki.com Pte Ltd as a Director in 2004. Together with John Hooi and Mike Goh, these 3 Directors are officially known as the Consultants of Fishingkaki. Each one has their own unique areas of expertise relating to the running of the forum.

Recreational fishing organizations
Singaporean sport websites